The flag of the Holy Roman Empire was not a national flag, but rather an imperial banner used by the Holy Roman Emperor; black and gold were used as the colours of the imperial banner, a black eagle on a golden background. After the late 13th or early 14th century, the claws and beak of the eagle were coloured red. From the early 15th century, a double-headed eagle was used.

In 1804, Napoleon Bonaparte declared the First French Empire. In response to this, Emperor Francis II of the Habsburg dynasty declared his personal domain to be the Austrian Empire and became Francis I of Austria. Taking the colours of the banner of the Holy Roman Emperor, the flag of the Austrian Empire was black and gold. Francis II was the last Holy Roman Emperor, with Napoleon forcing the empire's dissolution in 1806. After this point, these colours continued to be used as the flag of Austria until 1918.

The colours red and white were also significant during this period. When the Holy Roman Empire took part in the Crusades, a war flag was flown alongside the black-gold imperial banner. This flag, known as the "Saint George Flag", was a white cross on a red background: the reverse of the St George's Cross used as the flag of England. Red and white were also colours of the Hanseatic League (13th–17th centuries). Hanseatic trading ships were identifiable by their red-white pennants and most Hanseatic cities adopted red and white as their city colours (see Hanseatic flags). Red and white still feature as the colours of many former Hanseatic cities such as Hamburg or Bremen.

In northern Italy, during the conflict between the Guelphs and Ghibellines in the 12th to 14th centuries, the armies of the Ghibelline (pro-imperial) communes adopted the war banner of the Holy Roman Emperor (white cross on red) as their own, while the Guelph (anti-imperial) communes reversed the colours (red cross on white). These two schemes are prevalent in the modern civic heraldry of northern Italian towns and remains a revealing indicator of their past factional leanings. Traditionally Ghibelline towns like Pavia, Novara, Como, and Asti continue to display the Ghibelline cross. The Guelph cross can be found on the civic arms of traditionally Guelph towns like Milan, Vercelli, Alessandria, Reggio, and Bologna.

Imperial banners

War flag
The  (Imperial flag) was a field ensign of the Holy Roman Empire, originally an equestrian flag or gonfalon. An early bearer was Werner I, count of Winterthur, who carried the flag for Conrad II and Henry III and who died in the battle at Brůdek in 1040. In the 12th century, the  apparently showed a white cross on a red field. Thus, king Sigismund gave the banner to the Swiss Confederacy, sanctioning their war against the Habsburgs in 1415.

It was treated as an Imperial fief traditionally granted to Swabian nobles. In 1336, it was granted to Ulrich III, Count of Württemberg. It remained part of the heraldic insignia of the House of Württemberg until the 19th century. The flag itself was kept in Stuttgart until 1944, when it was destroyed in a bombing raid. The flag showed the imperial eagle in a square field, with a red  (pennon) on top. This latter flag showed two crossed swords in a black and white field.

Free Imperial Cities

Some free imperial cities took to displaying symbols of the empire, especially the Imperial eagle, as part of their flags or coats of arms.

References

External links

Heraldry of the Holy Roman Empire
Holy Roman Empire
1200s establishments in the Holy Roman Empire
1350s disestablishments in the Holy Roman Empire
1350 disestablishments in Europe
1430s establishments in the Holy Roman Empire
1806 disestablishments in the Holy Roman Empire
1437 establishments in Europe
1556 disestablishments in the Holy Roman Empire
Christian symbols